Fitovinany is a region located in southeast Madagascar. Its capital is Manakara. It is inhabited by the Antemoro people.

It formerly belonged to the region Vatovavy-Fitovinany that was split on 16 June 2021 to become the regions Vatovavy and Fitovinany.

The region extends along the southern part of the east coast of Madagascar. It is bordered by Vatovavy (North), Haute Matsiatra (West) and Atsimo-Atsinanana (South).

Administrative divisions
Fitovinany Region is divided into three districts, which are sub-divided into 76 communes.

 Ikongo District - 17 communes
 Manakara-Atsimo District - 42 communes
 Vohipeno District - 17 communes

Transportation
 Car, Taxi-Brousse
 One airport and one seaport:
Manakara Airport
Manakara seaport is only used for transshipments and transit (Lychee, coffee, ...)

Protected areas
Part of Fandriana-Vondrozo Corridor
Part of Marolambo National Park
Part of Ranomafana National Park (Vatovavy)

References
 EBDM

Fitovinany
Regions of Madagascar